Mohamed bin Rahmat (4 January 1938 – 1 January 2010) was a Malaysian politician, and former Information Minister of Malaysia (1978–1982, 1987–1999). He was famously known as Tok Mat, Mat Setia and Mat Mr Propaganda.

Personal life
Mohamed Rahmat was born on 4 January 1938 in the village of Pulai, Johor Bahru, Johor.

Political career
He was the Member of Parliament for the federal constituency of Pulai from 1969 to 1999 representing UMNO-Barisan Nasional. He was also appointed for a short time as the ambassador to Indonesia with a ministerial rank from 1982 to 1984.

Rahmat was appointed as the Secretary-General of both the party of United Malays National Organisation from 1988 to 1996 and the ruling coalition of Barisan Nasional from 1988 to 1999.

Career as Minister of Information

Rahmat has served as the Minister of Information two times during the administration of two different Prime Ministers: under Tun Hussein Onn from 1978 to 1982 and Mahathir Mohamad from 1987 to 1999.

As the Minister of Information, Mohamed introduced the "Setia Bersama Rakyat" (Semarak) programme which was aimed at instilling patriotism among the people.

One notorious account from his post in office was when he ordered rock singers to trim their long hair if they wanted to participate in programmes aired by public broadcaster Radio Televisyen Malaysia in 1992. Among those who followed the directive were the rock groups Wings, with lead singer Awie; and Search, with lead singer Amy.

Death
Mohamed Rahmat died on 1 January 2010 in Kuala Lumpur at the age of 71, just three days before his 72nd birthday. His body was laid to rest at the Bukit Kiara Muslim Cemetery, Kuala Lumpur.

Legacy
Several places and honours were named after him, including:
Kompleks Tan Sri Mohammad Rahmat in Tampoi, Johor Bahru, Johor.

Election results

Honours

Honours of Malaysia
  :
  Officer of the Order of the Defender of the Realm (KMN) (1972)
  Commander of the Order of Loyalty to the Crown of Malaysia (PSM) – Tan Sri (2000)
  :
  Knight Commander of the Order of the Crown of Johor (DPMJ) – Dato' (1973)
  Knight Grand Commander of the Order of the Crown of Johor (SPMJ) – Dato' (1975)
  Knight Grand Companion of the Order of Loyalty of Sultan Ismail of Johor (SSIJ) – Dato' (1977)
  Sultan Ibrahim Medal (PIS)
  Star of Sultan Ismail (BSI)
  :
  Grand Knight of the Order of the Crown of Pahang (SIMP) – formerly Dato', now Dato' Indera (1987)
  :
  Grand Commander of the Order of Kinabalu (SPDK) – Datuk Seri Panglima (1995)
  :
  Knight Commander of the Order of the Crown of Selangor (DPMS) – Dato' (1988)
  Knight Grand Companion of the Order of Sultan Salahuddin Abdul Aziz Shah (SSSA) – Dato' Seri (1990)
  :
  Knight Grand Commander of the Order of the Crown of Terengganu (SPMT) – Dato' (1996)
  :
  Grand Commander of the Exalted Order of Malacca (DGSM) – Datuk Seri (1997)
  :
  Knight Commander of the Most Exalted Order of the Star of Sarawak (PNBS) – Dato Sri (1981)

References

1938 births
2010 deaths
People from Johor
Malaysian people of Javanese descent
Malaysian politicians of Chinese descent
United Malays National Organisation politicians
Information ministers of Malaysia
Malaysian people of Malay descent
Malaysian Muslims
Grand Commanders of the Order of Kinabalu
Members of the Dewan Rakyat
Commanders of the Order of Loyalty to the Crown of Malaysia
Ambassadors of Malaysia to Indonesia
Knights Commander of the Order of the Crown of Johor
Knights Grand Commander of the Order of the Crown of Johor
Knights Grand Commander of the Order of the Crown of Terengganu
Knights Commander of the Most Exalted Order of the Star of Sarawak
Officers of the Order of the Defender of the Realm
University of Indonesia alumni
Knights Commander of the Order of the Crown of Selangor